Sandrecki is a Polish coat of arms. It was used by the Sandrecki szlachta family.

History

Blazon

Related Coat of Arms
 Ślepowron coat of arms

See also
 Polish heraldry
 Heraldic family
 List of Polish nobility coats of arms

Bibliography 
 Juliusz Hr. Ostrowski:Księga Herbowa Rodów Polskich, Warszawa 1897
 Leonhard Dorst:Schlesisches Wappenbuch oder die Wappen des Adels im souverainen Herzogthum Schlesien, der Grafschaft Glatz und der Oberlausitz, t. 1–3, Görlitz 1842-1849

Polish coats of arms